Sergey Petrovich Izotov (Russian: Серге́й Петро́вич Изо́тов; 30 June 1917 – 6 May 1983) was a Soviet major scientist and designer of aircraft engines. Izotov was the Chief Designer and General Designer of OKB-117 from 1960-1983. General Designer Leningrad NPO named after V. I. Klimov. Hero of Socialist Labour. Winner of Lenin Prize, Stalin Prize first degree and USSR State Prize. Honored Scientist and Technician of the RSFSR. Doctor of Technical Sciences (1968). Candidate for corresponding members of the USSR Academy of Sciences. Author of 30 scientific papers and 13 inventions. Freeman of the city of Rzeszów (Poland). Delegate of the 26th Congress of the Communist Party of the Soviet Union.

Bibliography 
 Герои труда/ Справочник о Героях Социалистического Труда и кавалерах ордена Трудовой Славы трех степеней из Башкортостана./ сост. Р. А. Валишин [и др.]. — Уфа : Китап, 2011. — 432 с. : ил. -.
 Башкирская энциклопедия. Гл. ред. М. А. Ильгамов т. 3. З-К. 2007. — 672 с.  науч. изд. Башкирская энциклопедия, Уфа.
 

1917 births
1983 deaths
Full Members of the Russian Academy of Sciences
Full Members of the USSR Academy of Sciences
Peter the Great St. Petersburg Polytechnic University alumni
People from Pavlogradsky Uyezd
Heroes of Socialist Labour
Stalin Prize winners
Lenin Prize winners
Recipients of the Order of Lenin
Recipients of the Order of the Red Banner of Labour
Recipients of the USSR State Prize
Early spaceflight scientists
Rocket scientists
Russian aerospace engineers
Russian space program personnel
Soviet aerospace engineers
Soviet space program personnel
Burials at Bogoslovskoe Cemetery